Estadio Municipal de El Alto, sometimes known as Estadio Municipal de Villa Ingenio, is a multi-use stadium in El Alto, Bolivia. It is currently used mostly for football matches, on club level by local sides Always Ready and Deportivo FATIC. The stadium has a capacity of 22,000 spectators.

The construction of the stadium began in December 2013, and was initially expected to be completed in December 2016. The stadium was inaugurated on 16 July 2017, with a match between Bolívar and The Strongest.

References

External links
Soccerway team profile

Football venues in Bolivia
Buildings and structures in La Paz Department (Bolivia)